Irving School may refer to:

Irving School (Mesa, Arizona), listed on the National Register of Historic Places in Maricopa County, Arizona
Irving School (Duluth, Minnesota), listed on the National Register of Historic Places in St. Louis County, Minnesota
Irving High School, Irving, Texas

See also
Washington Irving High School (disambiguation)